Seringia  is a genus of about 20 species of plants in the family Malvaceae and are mostly found in Western Australia. They are small shrubs with soft silken leaves.  The flowers are purple or mauve and appear in profusion.  The calyx is the most conspicuous part of the flower.

The following is a list of Seringia species recognised by the Australian Plant Census as at 30 November 2019:
 Seringia adenogyna C.F.Wilkins
 Seringia adenolasia F.Muell.
 Seringia arborescens W.T.Aiton
 Seringia cacaobrunnea C.F.Wilkins
 Seringia collina (Domin) C.F.Wilkins & Whitlock
 Seringia corollata Steetz
 Seringia denticulata (C.T.White) C.F.Wilkins
 Seringia elliptica C.F.Wilkins
 Seringia exastia (C.F.Wilkins) C.F.Wilkins & Whitlock
 Seringia grandiflora F.Muell.
 Seringia hermanniifolia F.Muell.
 Seringia hillii (F.Muell. ex Benth.) F.Muell.
 Seringia hookeriana (Walp.) F.Muell.
 Seringia integrifolia (Steud.) F.Muell.
 Seringia katatona (C.F.Wilkins) C.F.Wilkins & Whitlock
 Seringia lanceolata Steetz
 Seringia nephrosperma F.Muell.
 Seringia saxatilis C.F.Wilkins
 Seringia undulata C.F.Wilkins 
 Seringia velutina (Steetz) F.Muell.

References

 
Malvaceae genera
Trees of Australia
Flora of New South Wales
Flora of Queensland